VCX score is a smartphone camera benchmarking score described as "designed to reflect the user experience regarding the image quality and the performance of a camera in a mobile device". developed by a non-profit organisation - VCX-Forum.

VCX-Scores are used by specialist media and by VCX forum members to showcase the benchmarking of smartphones, as well as market photography technology.

VCX scoring methodology has been cited in various published books and independent imaging organisations.

Book: Camera image quality benchmarking 

 Article in Journal of Electronic Imaging - VCX: An industry initiative to create an objective camera module evaluation for mobile devices. 
 Article in Journal of Electronic Imaging - VCX Version 2020: Further development of a transparent and objective evaluation scheme for mobile phone cameras.

Service Provider 
VCX-Forum (where VCX is an acronym for Valued Camera eXperience) is an independent, non-governmental, standard-setting organisation for image quality measurement and benchmarking(VCX-Score). Its members are drawn from mobile phone manufacturers, mobile operators, imaging labs, mobile and computer chipset manufacturers, sensor manufacturers, device manufacturers, software companies, equipment providers, and camera & accessory manufacturers amongst others.

VCX-Score methodology

Tenets 
VCX Score methodologies are based on the 5 tenets

 VCX test measurements shall ensure the out-of-the-box experience 
 VCX shall remain 100% objective
 VCX shall remain open and transparent
 VCX shall employ/use an independent imaging lab for testing
 VCX shall seek continuous improvement

Parameters 
To ensure the results are as close to the end user experience as possible.

The image quality is evaluated for five parameters:

 Spatial Resolution
 Texture loss – the ability of the device to reproduce low contrast, fine details
 Sharpening – the ability of the device to sharpen with minimum disturbing artifacts
 Noise – the ability of the device to suppress noise without obfuscating too many details 
 Dynamic range – the ability of the device to capture maximum contrast in a scene 
 Color Reproduction – the ability of the device to capture colours as close to the original scene

Setup 

 The device under test is mounted on a tripod on rails to keep the reproduction scale constant and consistent between devices under test
 The entire lab is temperature-controlled to standard room temperature (23 °C ± 2 °C)
 The device under test is expected to: 
 reproduce reflective test targets like the "TE42-LL" (TE42-LL target in A1066 and A 460 (Selfie) in 4:3 and 16:9); 
 reproduce transmissive TE269B test target (for dynamic range measurements);
 reproduce test charts while mounted on a hand simulation device ( A device used to simulate the shake that the human hand to measure the shake reduction apparatus of the device. The simulation is based on the ISO 20954-2)
 the device under test is then used to capture a series of images and Video in various controlled lighting conditions

A detailed description of the setup and procedure is available as a whitepaper on the VCX-Forum website. as well as in the book page 318, section 9.4.3

Labs and testing 

Tests and benchmarks are conducted by independent labs. The test procedure, metrics, and weighting are dictated by the standard developed by VCX-Forum.

Benchmark publication 
VCX scores are published on the VCX-Forum website. Parts of this publication are often reproduced in specialist media and smartphone vendor social media channels as part of their marketing campaign.

Criticism

Metrics and weighting 

VCX-Forum claims that all test measurements must ensure the out-of-the-box experience (Tenet 1 of VCX-Forum) but does not specify what happens when the devices are updated later on.

VCX-Forum claims to be objective (Tenet 2 of VCX-Forum) but uses subjective components for the formation of the weighting itself. This subjective base is claimed to have come from blind tests for which no evidence has been provided on the website.

Despite the claim that VCX is an open and transparent standard (tenet 3 of VCX-forum), the details of weighting and scoring are only visible to members of the VCX Forum.

Most measurements are done with the device on a tripod and aimed at test charts, this does not reflect the common user scenario that VCX claims to reflect.

References

External links 
 

 
 
 
Standards organizations based in Europe
International Organization for Standardization
Non-profit organisations based in North Rhine-Westphalia
 
 
Smartphones
Product testing
Metrics
Benchmarks (computing)